Statewide primary elections for various state offices were held in the Commonwealth of Pennsylvania on May 17, 2005. Pennsylvania's general elections were then held statewide on November 8, 2005.

Judicial retention

Supreme Court

References

 
Pennsylvania